The Fort Meade Historical Museum is housed in the first indoor school of Fort Meade, Florida, and is located on the corner of Tecumseh Avenue and Main Street (Broadway).

History
The schoolhouse, built-in 1885, was donated to the Fort Meade Historical Society and moved from its original site on South Lanier Avenue to the present location in 1989.

Following the year as a school, this building served as a private residence and then a boarding house.  The extensive renovation took place in 1990 and 1991 on the first floor.  The building was then inactive until 1998, when a small group of volunteers took an interest and started to put some of the collection artifacts into place.

In 1999 refurbishing of the second floor began to accommodate the extensive collection of the Historical Society and in September 2000, the museum was opened to the public.  Many of the treasures within the museum were donated by descendants of the pioneer families of the community.  The museum also holds a pictorial collection of the historic homes that can be found throughout Fort Meade.

Location 
The Old Fort Meade School House is located within the bounds of the Fort Meade Historic District which is a U.S. historic district (designated as such on July 29, 1994) located in Fort Meade, Florida. The district is bounded by North 3rd Street, Orange Avenue, South 3rd Street and Sand Mountain Road. It contains 151 historic buildings.

References

External links
Visit Central Florida: Fort Meade Historical Museum - information

Houses in Polk County, Florida
Museums in Polk County, Florida
History museums in Florida
Historical society museums in Florida
Vernacular architecture in Florida
Historic district contributing properties in Florida
School buildings completed in 1885
National Register of Historic Places in Polk County, Florida
1885 establishments in Florida
Fort Meade, Florida